Dochow may refer to:

 Dochowo, a Polish village
 Saint Dochow or Dogwyn, a Welsh saint